Vedran Muratović (born 4 October 1983, in Zagreb) is a Croatian retired footballer who last played for Bregalnica Štip in the Macedonian Second League.

Career
He formerly played for Sarawak FA in the 2012 Malaysia Super League. Retrieved on 27 January 2012. He scored 7 goals in 10 games for Sarawak. In November 2012 Vedran signed a one-year contract for the Indonesian club Persebaya Surabaya, but 2 months later the contract was terminated because of the player's mother's loss.

He had a spell at Austrian lower league side SV Güssing in 2014/15.

References

External links
 
 
 

1983 births
Living people
Footballers from Zagreb
Association football forwards
Croatian footballers
NK Kamen Ingrad players
NK Slaven Belupo players
OFC Vihren Sandanski players
OFI Crete F.C. players
Entente SSG players
NK Čelik Zenica players
Sarawak FA players
Bhayangkara F.C. players
NK HAŠK players
FK Bregalnica Štip players
First Professional Football League (Bulgaria) players
Premier League of Bosnia and Herzegovina players
Malaysia Super League players
Macedonian First Football League players
Croatian expatriate footballers
Expatriate footballers in Bulgaria
Croatian expatriate sportspeople in Bulgaria
Expatriate footballers in Greece
Croatian expatriate sportspeople in Greece
Expatriate footballers in France
Croatian expatriate sportspeople in France
Expatriate footballers in Bosnia and Herzegovina
Croatian expatriate sportspeople in Bosnia and Herzegovina
Expatriate footballers in Malaysia
Croatian expatriate sportspeople in Malaysia
Expatriate footballers in Indonesia
Croatian expatriate sportspeople in Indonesia
Expatriate footballers in Austria
Croatian expatriate sportspeople in Austria
Expatriate footballers in North Macedonia
Croatian expatriate sportspeople in North Macedonia